Fernando Filipponi (born 3 April 1892, date of death unknown) was an Italian equestrian. He competed in two events at the 1936 Summer Olympics.

References

1892 births
Year of death unknown
Italian male equestrians
Olympic equestrians of Italy
Equestrians at the 1936 Summer Olympics
Place of birth missing